William Dickson may refer to:

William Dickson (Australian politician) (1893–1966), member of the Legislative Council of New South Wales
William Dickson (bishop) (1745–1804), Bishop of Down and Connor, 1784–1804
William Dickson (MP) (1748–1815) British Army commander and Member of Parliament
William Dickson (congressman) (1770–1816), American congressman from Tennessee
William Dickson (Falklands settler) (died 1833), administrator of Fort Louis in the Falklands in 1833
William Dickson (footballer, born 1866) (1866–1910), Scottish footballer
William Dickson (footballer, born 1923) (1923–2002), Northern Irish footballer
William Dickson (Northern Ireland politician) (born 1947), Northern Irish councillor and shooting survivor
William Dickson (Nova Scotia politician) (1779–1834), politician in Nova Scotia
William Dickson (RAF officer) (1898–1987), British Chief of the Air Staff, 1953–1956
William Dickson (Upper Canada) (1769–1846), lawyer, businessman and political figure in Upper Canada
William A. Dickson (1861–1940), U.S. Representative
William Kennedy Dickson (1860–1935), Franco-Scottish inventor and film pioneer
William Kirk Dickson (1860–1949), Scottish advocate, librarian and writer
William Purdie Dickson (1823–1901), Scottish professor of divinity
William Steel Dickson (1744–1824), Ulster Presbyterian minister and member of the Society of the United Irishmen
William Dickson (chemist) (1905–1992), Scottish chemist and educator
William Angus Dickson (1882–1967), Canadian politician in the Legislative Assembly of Ontario
William B. Dickson (1865–1942), business executive in the American steel industry
William M. Dickson (1827–1889), lawyer and judge from Cincinnati, Ohio
Billy Dickson, American cinematographer and television director
Billy Dickson (footballer) (born 1945), Scottish footballer

See also
William Dixon (disambiguation)
William Dixson (1870–1952), Australian businessman and benefactor